The 2019 season is Terengganu's second season in the Malaysia Super League since the rebranding in 2017.

Coaching staff

Squad information

Transfers

In

Out

Pre-season and friendlies

Tour of Vietnam (13 to 17 Jan 2019)

Competitions

Malaysia Super League

League table

Results summary

Result round by round

Matches

Malaysia FA Cup

Malaysia Cup

Group stage

Statistics

Appearances and goals

References

External links
 

Terengganu FC seasons
Malaysian football clubs 2019 season
Malaysian football club seasons by club